Puck Pieterse (born 13 May 2002) is a Dutch cyclist specializing in cyclo-cross and mountain biking. She became the U23 European cyclo-cross champion in 2020, and at age 20, the Elite Women's National Cyclocross Champion of the Netherlands in 2023. 

Pieterse is known for her ability to bunny hop the plank barriers in cyclo-cross races.

Major results

Cyclo-cross

2018–2019
 1st  National Junior Championships
 1st Leudelange
 2nd Contern
 3rd Pétange
2019–2020
 1st  UEC European Junior Championships
 2nd  UCI World Junior Championships
 2nd National Junior Championships
2020–2021
 1st  UEC European Under-23 Championships
2021–2022
 1st  UCI World Under-23 Championships
 2nd  UEC European Under-23 Championships
 3rd Overall UCI World Cup
1st  Under-23 classification
2nd Overijse
2nd Tábor
2nd Hulst
2nd Flamanville
3rd Namur
3rd Hoogerheide
 Ethias Cross
3rd Bredene
 3rd National Under-23 Championships
2022–2023
 1st  UEC European Under-23 Championships
 1st  National Championships
 1st Oisterwijk
 2nd Overall UCI World Cup
1st Overijse
1st Hulst
1st Val di Sole
1st Besançon
2nd Tábor
2nd Maasmechelen
2nd Antwerpen
2nd Dublin
2nd Zonhoven
2nd Benidorm
3rd Beekse Bergen
3rd Gavere
 Superprestige
1st Diegem
 X²O Badkamers Trophy
1st Herentals
 2nd  UCI World Championships
 3rd Woerden

Mountain Bike

2020
 1st  Cross-country, National Junior Championships
 3rd  Cross-country, UEC European Junior Championships
2021
 2nd  Cross-country, UEC European Under-23 Championships
2022
 1st  Cross-country, UEC European Under-23 Championships
 UCI Under-23 XCO World Cup
1st Leogang
2nd Albstadt
2nd Nové Město
3rd Lenzerheide
 2nd  Cross-country, UCI World Under-23 Championships
 2nd Cross-country, National Under-23 Championships

Road

2023
 5th Strade Bianche

References

External links
 
 Puck Pieterse at Cyclocross24

Sportspeople from Amersfoort
Dutch female cyclists
Cyclo-cross cyclists
Living people
2002 births
21st-century Dutch women
Cyclists from Utrecht (province)